Edelweiss is a given name derived from the Leontopodium nivale. It may refer to:

 Edelweiss (actress) (born 1977), born Oxana, Russian-Bulgarian pornographic actress
 Edelweiss Cheung (born 1985), Hong Kong model and beauty pageant titleholder who was crowned Miss Hong Kong 2008
Edel Quinn, baptized Edelweiss (1907-1944), Irish-born Roman Catholic lay-missionary and Envoy of the Legion of Mary to East Africa
Edelweis Rodriguez (1911-1962), Italian boxer who competed in the 1932 Summer Olympics

Given names derived from plants or flowers